Kootenay Pass, known locally as "the Salmo–Creston" is a mountain pass in the Selkirk Mountains of British Columbia, Canada. 
The pass summit divides the drainage basin of the Pend d'Oreille River on the west (via tributaries Stagleap Creek, the South Salmo River and the Salmo River) from that of Kootenay River/Kootenay Lake to the east (via tributary Summit Creek). It is used by the Crowsnest Highway to transverse the Selkirks, connecting the communities of Salmo and Creston.  At its opening the highway route was also dubbed the Kootenay Skyway.

The pass summit is located within Stagleap Provincial Park near Bridal Lake. A webcam  operates year-round showing the current conditions of the pass.

The Kootenay Pass is one of the highest highway-served passes in Canada that is open year-round, although it is frequently closed in bad weather for avalanche control and clearing of debris.

Avalanche control
Most avalanche control at Kootenay Pass is done by a Gazex system that allows avalanche technicians to trigger avalanches remotely from the comfort of their office at the summit, visible from the summit webcam. This Gazex system has allowed for the removal of large artillery stations that were used to fire ballistic shells into start zones. On occasion, artillery shells would not explode and had to be found and destroyed during summer months with considerable expense and danger.

References

External links
Bivouac.com entry

Selkirk Mountains
Kootenays
Mountain passes of British Columbia